Rishikul Vidyapeeth is a co-educational private school located in Sonipat, Haryana, India. The school has 200 teachers at the senior and junior level, and an enrollment of two thousand students.

History 

The school was established in 1990 by director Shri Shri Krishan Sharma (former principal and director of Shambhu Dayal Morden School, Sonipat). The school was opened in Sonipat City in 1988 and later on a new branch was established at Devru road, Sonipat.

Affiliation

The school is affiliated to the Central Board of Secondary Education, New Delhi and is involved in preparing students for the All India Secondary and the Senior Secondary Examinations. It conforms to the curriculum laid down for the 10+2 pattern of education.

External links
http://www.rishikulvidyapeeth.com/

Educational institutions established in 1990
Private schools in Haryana
Sonipat
1990 establishments in Haryana